Stigmina may refer to:
 Stigmina (fungus), a genus of fungal plant pathogens
 Stigmina (subtribe), a subtribe of wasps in the subfamily Pemphredoninae